Exordium is an EP by Dutch symphonic metal band After Forever, released on 17 October 2003. Another version of this album was released in 2004, with a bonus DVD entitled Insights. "The Evil That Men Do" is a cover of the Iron Maiden song, while "One Day I'll Fly Away" is a metal version of a ballad originally sung by Randy Crawford. This is the band's first recording with guitarist Bas Maas, who replaced Mark Jansen. Exordium is the first After Forever album to enter the Dutch Top 100 chart, where it remained for two weeks, peaking at #56.

On 11 November 2016, an expanded remastered edition of Exordium containing previously unreleased studio sessions, single edits and an interview was released to digital download and streaming services. Physically, this edition was released on 2 December as the last disc on a three-disc reissue of the band's third studio album, Invisible Circles.

Track listing

Insights
Insights is the name given to the DVD that came with the EP, containing a promotional video for "My Choice", along with a making of and backstage footage of the band in the studio.

Main
 "My Choice" (music video) – 4:13
 Making of "My Choice" – 11:58
 Credits

Special features
 "The Evil That Men Do" (Demo live compilation 2002) – 4:29
 Studio Recordings Exordium 2003 – 5:54
 Slide Show
 Artwork
 Lyrics
 Liner Notes

Personnel

After Forever
 Floor Jansen – vocals
 Sander Gommans – guitars, grunts
 Bas Maas – guitars
 Luuk van Gerven – bass
 Lando van Gils – keyboards
 André Borgman – drums

Production
 Hans Pieters – production, engineering
 Dennis Leidelmeijer – engineering
 Sascha Paeth – mixing
 Angelique Wassink – camera operator, screenplay
 Arne Pelgrom – camera operator
 Eric Pelgrom – set design
 Mirko Pelgrom – special effects, video editor
 Hans van Vuuren – executive producer
 Peter van 't Riet – mastering

Additional musicians
 Cees' Kieboom – piano, keyboards, strings and choir arrangements
 Ana Tudor – violin
 Jeanneke Biessen – violin
 Yvonne van de Pol – viola
 Sander van Berkel – violoncello
 Frans Grapperhaus – violoncello
 Yvette Boertje – announcer

Choir
 Caspar De Jonge, Ellen Bakker, Hans Cassa, Marga Okhuizen

References

2003 EPs
After Forever albums
Transmission (record label) EPs